Ostrobothnia County was a county of the Swedish Empire from 1634 to 1775.

The county was split in 1755 to County of Vasa and County of Uleåborg.

Maps

Governors
 
Melcher Wernstedt 1635–1642  
Hans Kyle 1642–1648 (Vasa County)  
Erik Soop 1644–1648 (Uleåborg County)  
Hans Kyle 1648–1650   
Ture Svensson Ribbing 1650–1654  
Johan Graan 1654–1668  
Jacob Duwall 1668–1669  
Johan Graan 1669–1674  
Didrik Wrangel af Adinal 1674–1685  
Gustaf Grass 1685–1694  
Johan Nilsson Ehrenskiöldh 1694–1706  
Johan Stiernstedt 1706 (acting) 
Lorentz Clerk 1706–1720  
Reinhold Wilhelm von Essen 1720–1732  
Carl Henrik Wrangel af Adinal 1732  
Broor Rålamb 1733–1734  
Carl Frölich 1734–1739  
Gustaf Creutz 1739–1746  
Gustaf Abraham Piper 1746–1761  
Gustaf von Grooth 1761–1762  
Carl Sparre 1763  
Fredrik Henrik Sparre 1763  
Lorentz Johan Göös 1763–1774  
Fredrik Magnus von Numers 1774 (acting)

Nyland
Nyland
1634 establishments in Sweden
1775 disestablishments in Sweden